The Wooster Municipal Airport was a general aviation airport serving Wooster, Ohio, USA. It was built in the 1920s and was closed sometime between 1968 and 1972 and was  replaced by Wayne County Airport 3 miles away on North Honeytown Road near Smithville, Ohio. The airport originally had sod runways but received a 3,100 foot paved runway in the 1950s. After closing, the runway was retained as a city street, now named Old Airport Road in Wooster.

Accidents and incidents
 April 14, 1937: A privately operated Taylor Cub plane took off in poor weather conditions and lacking sufficient power to maintain control. The aircraft crashed a mile from the airport, seriously injuring its two occupants, Harry C. and Thomas B. George of Washington, D.C.

References

Defunct airports in Ohio
1920s establishments in Ohio